The Asian Powerlifting Championships 2016 was held in Udaipur, India from 7 June 2016 to 12 June 2016.  It was organized by Powerlifting India (formerly Indian Powerlifting Federation), and sanctioned by Asian Powerlifting Federation and International Powerlifting Federation.

See also
Indian Powerlifting Federation
International Powerlifting Federation - 1975 World Congress and Championships

External links
Official Indian Powerlifting web site

References

Powerlifting competitions
2016 in weightlifting
International weightlifting competitions hosted by India
Sport in Udaipur
2016 in Indian sport